This list of notable Roseans is composed of former students of Institut Le Rosey, an international boarding school located in Rolle and Gstaad, Switzerland. "Old Rosean" (in English) and "Anciens Roséens" (in French) are officially used to describe alumni.

Notable Roseans

Aga Khan IV, the Aga Khan (born 1936), Imām of the Shia Imami Ismaili Muslims
Princess Zahra Aga Khan (born 1970), eldest child of the Aga Khan
King Albert II of Belgium (born 1934)
Alexander, Crown Prince of Yugoslavia (born 1945), claimant to the Serbian Throne
Sir Thomas Arnold (born 1947), British politician, retired Member of Parliament
Tae Ashida (born 1964), Japanese fashion designer
King Baudouin I of Belgium (1930–1993)
Nicolas Berggruen (born 1961), billionaire, founder of the Berggruen Institute
Bijan (1944–2011), Iranian-American fashion designer
Francesco and Livio Borghese, Borghese family members, of the Italian noble House of Borghese
Garech Browne (born 1939), member of the Guinness brewing family and patron of Irish Arts
Arpad Busson (born 1963), Swiss financier
Ian Campbell, 12th Duke of Argyll (1937–2001), Clan Chief of the Clan Campbell
John Casablancas (1942-2013), founder of Elite Model Management
Julian Casablancas (born 1978), musician, band member of The Strokes
David Cecil, 6th Marquess of Exeter (previously Lord Burghley), winner of the 400m hurdles at the 1928 Summer Olympics
Joe Dassin (1938-1980), French-American singer and composer
Alki David (born 1968), Nigerian-born Greek billionaire heir and media entrepreneur
Prince Edward, Duke of Kent (born 1935), member of the British Royal Family and President of the All England Lawn Tennis and Croquet Club
Castellini Baldissera family members, of the Italian textile and banking fortune.
Benno Elkan (1877–1960), German-born British sculptor, one of the first Roseans
Ghida Fakhry, Washington, D.C. co-anchor of Al Jazeera English
Emanuele Filiberto, Prince of Venice and Piedmont (born 1972), of the Italian House of Savoy
Dodi Al-Fayed (1955–1997), movie producer, romantically linked to Diana, Princess of Wales, died in a car accident together in Paris
José Ferrer (1909–1992), Academy Award-winning actor
Firouz Nosrat-ed-Dowleh III, Prince of Qajar dynasty (1889-1937) 
King Fuad II of Egypt (born 1952), the last King of Egypt
Alexandra von Fürstenberg (born 1972), former daughter-in-law of fashion designer Diane von Fürstenberg and one of the Miller Sisters
Prince Egon von Fürstenberg (1946–2004), fashion designer, of the House of Fürstenberg
Pia Getty (born 1966), socialite, one of the Miller Sisters
Isabel Getty (born 1993), socialite and rock musician, daughter of Pia Getty.
Toulo de Graffenried, Baron de Graffenried (1914–2007), Swiss motor racing driver
Guillaume, Hereditary Grand Duke of Luxembourg (born 1981)
Francesca von Habsburg (born 1958), art collector and the wife of Karl Habsburg-Lothringen
Albert Hammond, Jr. (born 1980), singer, musician, band member of The Strokes
H. John Heinz III (1938–1991), United States Senator
Richard Helms (1913–2002), Director of Central Intelligence and United States Ambassador to Iran
Hermon Hermon-Hodge, 3rd Baron Wyfold (1915–1999), member of the British House of Lords
Hohenzollern family members, of the Prussian royal House of Hohenzollern
John Caldwell Holt (1923–1985), American author and educator, pioneer in youth rights theory
Sir Alistair Horne (1925-2017), British historian, biographer
J.B. Jackson (1909–1996), French-born American writer, landscape designer
King Juan Carlos I of Spain (born 1938)
Khaled Juffali, Saudi businessman
Sir Michael Kadoorie (born 1941), Hong Kong business magnate
Justine Kasa-Vubu, politician, daughter of former President of the DRC, Joseph Kasa-Vubu
Rhonda Ross Kendrick (born 1971), actress, daughter of Diana Ross
Adnan Khashoggi family, the children of Saudi arms dealer Adnan Khashoggi
Michael Korda (born 1933), writer, former Editor-in-Chief of Simon & Schuster
James Laughlin (1914–1997), American poet and book publisher
Sean Taro Ono Lennon (born 1975), musician, son of John Lennon and Yoko Ono
Warner LeRoy (1935–2001), owner of Tavern on the Green and the Russian Tea Room
Marie-Chantal, Crown Princess of Greece (born 1968), member of the Greek Royal Family and one of the Miller Sisters
Molson family members, of the Molson Breweries Canada family
Leona Naess (born 1974), British singer-songwriter
Nicholas Negroponte (born 1943), founder and Chairman Emeritus of the MIT Media Lab
Stavros Niarchos family, the children of Greek shipping magnate Stavros Niarchos
Álvaro Noboa (born 1950), Ecuadorian businessman, candidate for the Ecuadorian Presidency
Paul Noritaka Tange (born 1958), Japanese architect, son of Kenzō Tange
King Ntare V of Burundi (1947–1972), the last King of Burundi
Ali Reza Pahlavi I (1922–1954), brother of Shah Mohammad Reza Pahlavī
Gholam Reza Pahlavi (1923–2017), son of Reza Shah
Shah Mohammad Reza Pahlavī (1919–1980), the last Shah of Iran
Pahlavī family members, of the Pahlavī dynasty of the Persian Empire
Prince Rainier III of Monaco (1923–2005)
Andrea di Robilant, Italian fiction writer
Winthrop Paul Rockefeller (1948–2006), Lieutenant Governor of Arkansas, member of the Rockefeller Family
Alexis von Rosenberg, Baron de Rédé (1922–2004), art collector, socialite
Tracee Ellis Ross (born 1972), actress, daughter of Diana Ross
Rothschild family members, of the banking and finance dynasty
Robin Russell, 14th Duke of Bedford (1940–2003)
Tatiana Santo Domingo (born 1983), Brazilian and Colombian socialite and heiress
 Richard René Silvin, author and historian
Tad Szulc (1926–2001), non-fiction writer, New York Times correspondent
Taittinger family members, French champagne producers
Mayuko Takata (born 1971), Japanese actress, Iron Chef judge
Elizabeth Taylor family, the children of Elizabeth Taylor and Michael Wilding
Irving Thalberg Jr. (1930–1987), American philosopher, son of Irving Thalberg and Norma Shearer
David Verney, 21st Baron Willoughby de Broke (born 1938), member of the British House of Lords
Thady Wyndham-Quin, 7th Earl of Dunraven and Mount-Earl, Irish peer
 Adam Zamoyski, member of the Zamoyski family 
 Prince Dasho Ugyen Jigme Wangchuck of Bhutan
 Princess Ashi Euphelma Choden Wangchuck of Bhutan
 Princess Fawzia-Latifa of Egypt

anciens Roséens
In English, the French terms  are also sometimes used: anciens Roséens (f. anciennes Roséennes), Roséens (Roséennes) or simply anciens (f. anciennes).  When referring to both genders together, the masculine form is used.

References

External links
 Official alumni website

Lists of Swiss people by school affiliation